His Way is a 2011 television documentary film about Jerry Weintraub, an American film producer and former chairman and CEO of United Artists. The film was directed by Douglas McGrath.

The film features interviews with Weintraub, Jane Morgan, George H. W. Bush, Barbara Bush, George Clooney, Brad Pitt, Julia Roberts, Elliott Gould, Ellen Barkin, James Caan, Matt Damon and Bruce Willis.

References

External links
 

2011 television films
2011 films
2011 documentary films
HBO documentary films
Documentary films about Hollywood, Los Angeles
Films produced by Graydon Carter
2010s English-language films
2010s American films